Wu is a Chinese surname. It is the 89th name on the Hundred Family Surnames poem. It means ‘five’
in Chinese, an alternative form of the character 五. A 2013 study found that it was the 116th most common name, shared by 1,710,000 people or 0.130% of the population, with the province with the most being Guangdong.

Origins
 from the personal name of Wu Xu (伍胥), an official during the reign of the legendary Yellow Emperor
 from the personal name of Wu Shen (伍參), an official in Chu during the Spring and Autumn period

Notable people
 Wu Jin-lin (伍錦霖), President of Examination Yuan
 Wu Yee-sun (伍宜孫, 1900 – 2005) a Hong Kong entrepreneur and billionaire who founded the Wing Lung Bank
 Wu Shih-wen (伍世文), Minister of National Defense of the Republic of China (2000–2002)
 Christine Ng Wing-mei (Chinese: 伍詠薇; born 1969) is an actress and singer based on Hong Kong
伍連德 – Wu Lien-teh, (1879-1960) Malaysia-born Chinese physician, pioneer epidemiologist 
Wu, Melissa, Australian diver
伍潔芳 (伍洁芳) – WuDunn, Sheryl, American writer
 Johnny Eng (born ca. 1958) (Chinese: 伍少衡; Jyutping: ng5 siu3 hang4), also known as Onionhead (Chinese: 蔥頭; Jyutping: cung1 tau4) or Machinegun Johnny,[1] is a Hong Kong-born American criminal, leader of the Flying Dragons (gang)
伍家球 – Wu, William F., science fiction author
伍子胥 – Wu Zixu, general in the Spring and Autumn period of Chinese history
伍佰 – Wu Bai, stage name of Taiwanese singer Wu Chun-lin (吳俊霖)
Celeste Ng (Chinese: 伍綺詩) (born 1980) is an American writer and novelist
Alice Wu (伍思薇; born 1970) American film director and screenwriter
Mike Eng (伍國慶; born 1946) American politician and member of the Democratic Party
Philip Ng Wan-lung (Chinese: 伍允龍) is a Hong Kong-born American actor, martial artist and action choreographer
Chelsia Ng (伍家丽) is an actress from Malaysia

See also
 Wujiagang District, in Yichang, Hubei

References

Individual Chinese surnames